List of episodes from the 1955–1962 television series Alfred Hitchcock Presents and the 1962–1965 The Alfred Hitchcock Hour:

Series overview

Episodes

Season 1 (1955–56)

Season 2 (1956–57)

Season 3 (1957–58)

Season 4 (1958–59)

Season 5 (1959–60)

Season 6 (1960–61)

Season 7 (1961–62)

Season 8 (1962–63)
Beginning with this season, the program was expanded to an hour and re-titled The Alfred Hitchcock Hour.

Season 9 (1963–64)

Season 10 (1964–65)

See also
 List of Alfred Hitchcock Presents episodes (1985-1989 series)

References

Lists of anthology television series episodes